Viacheslav Volodymyrovych Tkachenko (born in 1973) is a Ukrainian figure skating coach and former competitive pair skater. Competing with Svitlana Prystav for the Soviet Union, he became a three-time World Junior medalist in the early 1990s. Later in their career, the pair represented Ukraine. They appeared at three senior-level ISU Championships, placing 10th at the 1993 European Championships in Helsinki (Finland), 13th at the 1993 World Championships in Prague (Czech Republic), and 14th at the 1994 European Championships in Copenhagen (Denmark).

After retiring from competition, Tkachenko became a skating coach. He began working at the Meteor Sports Complex in Dnipro in 1998. His most notable student is Anna Khnychenkova, who qualified a spot for Ukraine at the 2018 Winter Olympics.

Results  
(with Prystav)

References 

1973 births
Ukrainian figure skating coaches
Ukrainian male pair skaters
Soviet male pair skaters
Living people
Sportspeople from Dnipro
World Junior Figure Skating Championships medalists